Atholl Henderson (born 7 October 1957) is a Scottish former professional football player and coach. After retiring from the playing side, he became a coach who introduced thousands of children to football in various roles.

He played for five clubs in a nine-year career: St Johnstone, Celtic, Dunfermline Athletic and Brechin City.

Playing career

St Johnstone
While studying at Perth Academy, in his home city, Henderson signed for St Johnstone, who were then based at Muirton Park and managed by Willie Ormond, on a schoolboy form on 28 December 1971. He left school in 1974 and went full-time with Saints for two seasons. The club went part-time at the end of his second season, at which point he was released.

Celtic
Henderson was training with Rangers in 1976 when he was approached by their Old Firm rivals Celtic, after John Clark put the wheels in motion. He playard "a few games" for them, but suffered an injury in April that kept him out for about eighteen months.

Forfar Athletic
After a brief, uneventful stint with Dunfermline Athletic, Henderson signed for Forfar Athletic in 1977. He made 37 league appearances and scored nine goals in three years.

Brechin City
He joined Brechin City in 1979, and in four years he made 83 league appearances and found the net fourteen times. He retired from playing at the end of his contract in 1983.

Coaching career
Henderson's first official community post occurred in 1992, but he had already been coaching under St Johnstone manager Alex Rennie around 1984, holding popular Saturday-morning coaching sessions on the all-weather pitches at McDiarmid Park. He later began Soccer Sevens games on Perth's North Inch on Sunday mornings. In 1992, he applied to become a coach at several clubs, including St Johnstone, but he had success with their Tayside rivals Dundee United. He remained at Tannadice for two-and-a-half years.

The opportunity to return to Perth came in 1994, and he joined Paul Sturrock's backroom staff as both a coach and a community officer. In 2016, former Northern Ireland international Danny Griffin, who Henderson brought through the youth ranks at St Johnstone, was appointed to the board of the community trust.

In December 2021, Henderson retired, after exactly fifty years in the game, with his final role being chief executive of St Johnstone's Community Trust, which became a registered charity in 2016. In 2020, the club won the Scottish Football Association's "Best Professional Club in the Community" award.

References

External links
 Atholl Henderson – Neil Brown's football statistics
"Atholl Henderson Retires - Interview" – The St Johnstone Community Trust, YouTube, 11 January 2022

Living people
1957 births
Scottish footballers
St Johnstone F.C. players
Celtic F.C. players
Dunfermline Athletic F.C. players
Forfar Athletic F.C. players
Brechin City F.C. players
Scottish Premier League players
Scottish Football League players
St Johnstone F.C. non-playing staff
Association football forwards